Zaolkhovsky is a rural locality (a khutor) in Bukanovskoye Rural Settlement, Kumylzhensky District, Volgograd Oblast, Russia. The population was 146 as of 2010.

Geography 
Zaolkhovsky is located in forest steppe, on Khopyorsko-Buzulukskaya Plain, on the right bank of the Khopyor River, 40 km southwest of Kumylzhenskaya (the district's administrative centre) by road. Bukanovskaya is the nearest rural locality.

References 

Rural localities in Kumylzhensky District